David John Batt is an Australian politician. He was the Liberal National Party member for Bundaberg in the Queensland Legislative Assembly from 2017 to 2020.

Prior to his election to Queensland Parliament, Batt served as a member of Bundaberg Regional Council from 2008 to 2017.

References

Year of birth missing (living people)
Living people
Members of the Queensland Legislative Assembly
Liberal National Party of Queensland politicians